is a Japanese actor and voice actor. He is best known for playing Geki/TyrannoRanger in Kyōryū Sentai Zyuranger and the titular character of Kamen Rider J. He also voiced Keisuke Harukaze in the Ojamajo Doremi franchise, Thierry Rothschild in Ashita no Nadja, and Akira Mimasaka in Boys Over Flowers.

Biography
Yūta Mochizuki was born  on 14 March 1967 in Kanagawa Prefecture. He came from the Japan Action Club, and he joined the Japan Action Club Training School in 1984.

In 1991, he appeared in episodes 40 and 41 as one of the Neo-Jetman in Chōjin Sentai Jetman. In 1992, he starred as Geki/TyrannoRanger in Kyōryū Sentai Zyuranger. Mochizuki said that, having only known about Himitsu Sentai Gorenger at the time, when he saw the name Zyuranger he thought there would be ten people in it. Mochizuki reprised his role as Geki in the 2014 film Zyuden Sentai Kyoryuger vs. Go-Busters: The Great Dinosaur Battle! Farewell Our Eternal Friends.

Mochizuki auditioned for Kamen Rider Black, but said "I didn't hesitate". In 1994, he starred in Kamen Rider J as Kōji Segawa, the titular character. Mochizuki said in an interview that wanted the director to make a difference between Geki, a warrior from the beginning, and Segawa, an ordinary human involved in an incident, transformed, and strengthened after being remodeled.。

In anime, Mochizuki voiced Keisuke Harukaze, the father of the titular character of Ojamajo Doremi, Thierry Rothschild in Ashita no Nadja, Tomorokofusuki in Yume no Crayon Oukoku, and Akira Mimasaka in Boys Over Flowers.

Mochizuki has made appearances at the 2015 Lexington Comic & Toy Convention, Power Morphicons 2014 and 2015,
 and attended the Japanese premiere of the Power Rangers franchise's self-titled film adaptation alongside Takumi Kizu.

Personal life
As of 2012, Mochizuki was living in Okayama Prefecture.

His special skills include karate and soccer.

Filmography

Live-action
1991
Chōjin Sentai Jetman, Neo-Jetman
1992-1993
Kyōryū Sentai Zyuranger, Geki/TyrannoRanger
2014
Zyuden Sentai Kyoryuger vs. Go-Busters: The Great Dinosaur Battle! Farewell Our Eternal Friends, Geki/TyrannoRanger

Anime
1996
Boys Over Flowers, Akira Mimasaka
1997
Yume no Crayon Oukoku, Tomorokofusuki
1999
Ojamajo Doremi, Keisuke Harukaze
2000
Ojamajo Doremi, Keisuke Harukaze
2001
Ojamajo Doremi, Keisuke Harukaze
2002
Ojamajo Doremi, Keisuke Harukaze
2003
Ashita no Nadja, Thierry Rothschild

References

1967 births
Living people
Japanese male film actors
Japanese male television actors
Japanese male stage actors
Japanese male voice actors
Male voice actors from Kanagawa Prefecture
20th-century Japanese male actors
21st-century Japanese male actors